The Pasir Pelangi Palace is a royal palace of the Tunku Mahkota (Crown prince) of Johor. It is located in the royal town of Pasir Pelangi, Johor Bahru, Johor, Malaysia.

See also
Istana Besar
Istana Bukit Serene
Pasir Pelangi

Buildings and structures in Johor Bahru
Palaces in Johor
Royal residences in Malaysia